Tsavo Thermal Power Station, also Kipevu II Thermal Power Station   is a , heavy fuel oil-fired thermal power station in Kenya.

Location
The power station is located in the port city of Mombasa, adjacent to a similar state-owned project known as Kipevu I Thermal Power Station. The coordinates of the power station are: 4°01'53.0"S, 39°38'02.0"E (Latitude:4°01'53.0"S; Longitude:39°38'02.0"E).

Overview
The power station is owned and operated by Tsavo Power Company Limited (TPCL). TPCL is in turn owned by a consortium of international power developers and financiers including the International Finance Corporation, the UK-based Actis Capital, the Finnish company Wärtsilä, US-based Cinergy Global Power and the Aga Khan Fund for Economic Development. The power company came online in 2001. The electricity generated is sold to Kenya Power and Lighting Company, under a 20-year power purchase agreement. The raw material for the power plant is Heavy Fuel Oil. In 2015, Actis Capital sold their shareholding to the CDC Group and Norfund for US$227 million.

Developers and financing
The table below summarizes the shareholding in Tsavo Power Company Limited (TPCL), the owner-operator of Tsavo Thermal Power Station, as at 1 April 2016:

See also

Kenya Power Stations
Africa Power Stations
World Power Stations

References

External links
Thermal power generators increase five-month output

Mombasa County
Oil-fired power stations in Kenya